Personalized learning, individualized instruction, personal learning environment and direct instruction all refer to efforts to tailor education to meet the different needs of students.

Overview
The use of the term "personalized learning" dates back to at least the early 1960s, but there is no widespread agreement on the definition and components of a personal learning environment. Even enthusiasts for the concept admit that personal learning is an evolving term and doesn't have any widely accepted definition.

In 2005, Dan Buckley defined two ends of the personalized learning spectrum: "personalization for the learner", in which the teacher tailors the learning, and "personalization by the learner", in which the learner develops skills to tailor his own learning. This spectrum was adopted by the (2006) Microsoft's Practical Guide to Envisioning and Transforming Education.

Definitions
The United States National Education Technology Plan 2017 defines personalized learning as follows:

Typically technology is used to try to facilitate personalized learning environments.

According to researcher Eduard Pogorskiy:

Instructional design 
Proponents of personalized learning say that many elements of curriculum, assessment, and instructional design must be present in classrooms for students to succeed and often use software systems to manage and facilitate student-led instruction. Proponents argue that classroom learning activities must build upon students' prior knowledge and teachers need to allocate time for practice. Advocates argue that teachers must continuously assess student learning against clearly defined standards and goals, and student input into the assessment process is integral.

Conferring 
As stated above by the 2017 United States National Education Technology Plan, "Personalized learning refers to instruction in which the pace of learning and the instructional approach are optimized the needs for each learner." Conferring is a process in which this can be accomplished. Conferring, as defined by Julie Kallio, is a "regular, goal-oriented meeting between the teacher and student(s) where they talk about learning progress, process, and/or products." Conferring, more simply, is a way to provide more personalized feedback.

Learning, in any context, requires some form of feedback. In schools, this feedback is almost entirely thought of as the teacher providing feedback to the student. The idea of providing feedback to advance student learning is best understood in the framework of the "zone of proximal development" or ZPD. Psychologist Lev Vygotski has defined the ZPD as "the distance between the actual developmental level as determined by independent problem solving and the level of potential development as determined through problem solving under adult guidance or in collaboration with more capable peers". More plainly, a student has a certain level they can achieve by themselves and with support they are able to achieve a higher level of learning. However, there is still some level in which the student is incapable of reaching, no matter what support is provided. For example, a student may be working on double digit addition. Their current knowledge may already provide them with the skills to move on to triple digit addition without any help. If the student is introduced to multiplication, however, they will need help to understand that multiplication is a quicker way to represent the same number being added onto itself a defined number of times. Where this help occurs is the student's ZPD. Even with help though, it is not reasonable to expect the student to learn how to solve a calculus problem. The struggle for teachers is how to provide the right amount of help to each student. If a teacher provides information to the whole class too quickly, some students are left behind trying to figure out the first step. Conversely, if a teacher provides information to the whole class too slowly, some students will finish rapidly and be left with nothing to do. Conferring is a tool that teachers have used to help mitigate that issue.

Conferring first gained prominence in the book One to one: the art of conferring with young writers by Lucy Calkins, Amanda Hartman, and Zoe Ryder White. In the work, Calkins and her co-writers describe how effective writing workshops for students included individual writing conferences (conferring), where teachers would sit and talk with their students about their writing. Per the book, "Conferring can give us the force that makes our mini-lessons and curriculum development and assessment and everything else more powerful. It gives us an endless resource of teaching wisdom, an endless source of accountability, a system of checks and balances. And, it gives us laughter and human connection -the understanding of our children that gives spirit to our teaching." Calkins believed that there were three main components to every conferring session: Research, Decide, and Teach. Research focused on where the student was in their current writing, Decide would help the teacher choose what to teach the student, and Teach would use modeling and guiding practice to further advance student learning. In their book The Writing Workshop, Katie Wood Ray and Lester L. Laminack added a fourth component in where after the teaching portion, the student and/or the teacher would "Make a Record".  This modified model can be thought in the terms of: research, decide, teach, record. The benefits of using conferring have been documented in a couple of studies.

Using a mix method case study approach in observing a group of 4th grade students, Javaye Devette Stubbs posed the question: "How does the implementation of one-on-one conferring promote higher order thinking skills in students with difficulties in reading?" The results from her pre and post-test found that "even those with reading difficulties did show a significant gain in higher order thinking skills". In a separate study, the educator Antony Smith examined the effectiveness of using teacher-student writing conference for English language learners (ELLs). Observing two students who were ELLs in a second-grade classroom working on a book project, Smith found that the work produced "looks similar to what is produced by native English speakers". Smith later suggests that the success of the two students were largely tied to the writing conferences, and goes on to state that writing conferences are the "heart of the writing process, and with this in mind, the potential of the teacher-student writing conference becomes clear".

The information can be summarized into three main takeaways. First, building student knowledge is dependent on the current level of knowledge the student has and what kind of support they are provided. Second, conferring is a model that can provide student support through a structured four-part process. Third, conferring has been shown to increase student learning in both reading and writing.

Debate
Andy Hargreaves and Dennis Shirley write that while there are advantages in students being able to access information instantly on-line, one should not mistake such processes for "something deeper, more challenging, and more connected to compelling issues in their world and their lives".

Alfie Kohn wrote that while personalized learning may sound like a useful strategy for education, in practice it's mostly just about selling technology products. Personalized learning promises a strategy to specifically adjust education to the unique needs and skills of individual children, he argued, but really it means merely "adjusting the difficulty level of prefabricated skills-based exercises based on students' test scores... [and] requires the purchase of software from one of those companies that can afford full-page ads in Education Week".  While "certain forms of technology can be used to support progressive education", Kohn wrote, "...meaningful (and truly personal) learning never requires technology. Therefore, if an idea like personalization is presented from the start as entailing software or a screen, we ought to be extremely skeptical about who really benefits."

Next Steps For Research On Personalized Learning 
Dr. Ces'Ari Garcia-Delmuro advocates in her research on personalized learning for other researchers to continue including teacher voice in their studies of personalized learning programs as a way to improve these programs for teachers and students. Additionally, more studies should be conducted that focus on other low SES schools implementing personalized learning. Furthermore, donors that are giving to the advancement of personalized learning need to consult new research to ensure that they are donating to programs that benefit all students including those who belong to vulnerable populations (students in special education, bilingual emergent students, and students of low socioeconomic status), not just those students who are able to self-direct. In future research, it is important to continue to study these schools who are piloting personalized learning to see how their needs change over time. Because these programs are still relatively new, it would be helpful to understand the perceptions of teachers who are using  these programs for five years or longer to continue assisting teacher and school sites as they mature in their personalized learning use. Additionally, research which compares teacher perception of personalized learning compared to student academic outcomes will be helpful once schools new to personalized learning overcome their fifth year of implementation.

See also 
Adaptive learning
Blended learning
Flip teaching
Gradual release of responsibility
Mastery learning
School of one
School organizational models
Teachers College Reading and Writing Project

References

External links
European Union – The Life Long Programme
European Union - Grundtvig Project LeadLab
Ultimate Personalized Learning Guide - Education Elements

Pedagogy
Educational practices